Haavardsholm is a surname. Notable people with the surname include:

Espen Haavardsholm (born 1945), Norwegian novelist, poet, biographer and essayist
Frøydis Haavardsholm (1896–1984), Norwegian visual artist and book illustrator
Ole Haavardsholm (born 1989), Norwegian cyclist

Norwegian-language surnames